Nicole Raima McKee (born ) is a New Zealand politician who was placed third on the ACT party list, and elected to the New Zealand parliament at the 2020 general election as a representative of the ACT New Zealand.

Early life and career
McKee moved to Rotorua in her teens, then returned to Wellington as an adult. McKee became pregnant when she was 24, but her partner died in a car accident a week before their daughter was born.

Political career

Mckee was a strong critic of the Sixth Labour Government's gun laws, passed following the Christchurch mosque shootings of 15 March 2019. The new restrictions on gun ownership and game animal management are the issues which propelled her to enter politics. She met David Seymour, ACT's leader, through their opposition to those gun laws, and joined the ACT Party in June 2020.

While she did not win the electorate, McKee came in via the party list since ACT won 7.6% of the vote, entitling it to ten seats in Parliament. She is ACT's spokesperson for Firearms Law Reform, Conservation, Justice and Veterans.

Personal life
McKee lives in Hataitai, Wellington. She is married, and she and her husband Duncan have four children. She enjoys hunting and wool spinning. McKee is Māori and her iwi is Ngāpuhi.

References

1970s births
Living people
ACT New Zealand MPs
Members of the New Zealand House of Representatives
New Zealand list MPs
Gun rights advocates
People from Lower Hutt
Māori MPs
New Zealand Māori women
Ngāpuhi people
Year of birth missing (living people)